Ebbsfleet Valley is a new town and redevelopment area in Kent, South East England, and part of the Thames Gateway, southwest of Gravesend. Development is coordinated by the Ebbsfleet Development Corporation.

It is named after the valley of the Ebbsfleet River, which it straddles. Although a small part of the site in the east lies within the borough of Gravesham, Ebbsfleet Valley primarily sits in the borough of Dartford.

Toponymy
The name Ebbsfleet is an artificial creation of a seventeenth-century antiquarian, partly inspired by the name of Ebbsfleet in Thanet,  to the east.

Redevelopment

Much of the land is brownfield and was formerly used by industry; having been previously owned by the APCM, Blue Circle and most recently by Lafarge. The new community is planned to have a population of 40,000. Ebbsfleet International railway station was opened in November 2007 and provides services to Continental Europe on High Speed 1. Domestic services to St Pancras railway station in central London are operated by Southeastern.

In March 2014, the British government announced its intention to construct a garden city at Ebbsfleet for up to 15,000 homes. In November 2015, the British Chancellor of the Exchequer attempted to kick start the project by injecting £300 million.

Richard Rogers, a former government adviser on cities, said: "They shouldn’t be building down there. East London still has masses of brownfield land, so why are we building 15 miles out? This is not a sustainable option."

Ebbsfleet Development Corporation

In 2015, the government established the Ebbsfleet Development Corporation as a non-departmental public body of the Department of Communities and Local Government under the Ebbsfleet Development Corporation (Area and Constitution) Order 2015 The purpose of the development corporation is to oversee development by private housebuilders and act as local planning authority for planning permission requests relating to the designated development area.

Reaction 
The development is referred to as a garden city, intended to be sustainable with publicly owned infrastructure and facilities, with inhabitants working on the estates. This was said to be inspired by the Stockholm suburbs such as Hammarby where the design there is to have cycleways, and 1,500 self-build homes, houseboats and parkland. 
The planning committee chair, Derek Hunnisett, said "We are looking for a higher quality than the normal and what we are getting [so far] is the norm – standard off-the-peg stuff.".

The nearest house is less than 20 minutes walk to Ebbsfleet International station.

The current development already contradicts policy and academic papers written in recent times to inform the coalition government's 'blueprint'. "A strong landscape structure, that matures over time to create a leafy green character. Tree lined streets, green verges and planted front gardens".

London Paramount Entertainment Resort
In the following May, London Paramount Entertainment Resort were given permission to build a theme park on potential housing land on the adjoining Swanscombe Peninsula site, nationally significant infrastructure project status, allowing the developers to bypass local planning requirements and build a leisure complex that by 2019 may create employment for 27,000 people. Highways England consulted, in early 2017, about improvements to the A2 junctions in the area, citing a traffic increase of 200%.

Telecommunications
There will be a trial by BT of a fibre network in the Ebbsfleet valley, potentially offering the highest speed internet connection to home users in the United Kingdom, with the exception of Ashford in Kent. It has been confirmed they will be offering speeds of 100Mbit/s which will transfer TV, Broadband and Telephone via optical fibre.  Businesses and residents of the area will be given a new telephone dialling code, 01987, though the small number of users who already have numbers allocated from the neighbouring codes (01322 or 01474) are able to retain them. The 01987 code was adopted in April 2008, in preference to the vacant 01321 code.

Archaeology
The Ebbsfleet River is of great historical importance in English history and prehistory, and much archaeological excavation has taken place here over the years. Quarrying here has revealed signs of extensive occupation some 100,000 years ago: flint knapping was carried out here, the remains of a straight-tusked elephant have been found. Distinctive pottery from the Neolithic age has been discovered; such pots give their name to an important sub-culture of the period.

Belgic Britons, in the late Iron Age have left behind traces of their culture. Prior to the construction of the Channel Tunnel Rail Link in this area, archaeological work undertaken at Ebbsfleet found an Anglo-Saxon mill. The river, which is fed by eight natural springs at Springhead, was held sacred by the Celts who settled in the area around 100 BC. They were followed by the Romans; their Watling Street passes through the site, and a villa has been excavated.

A large flooded quarry, Sawyer's Lake, can be found nearby.

Transport
Ebbsfleet International railway station is served by Southeastern High Speed and formerly, Eurostar services.

Ebbsfleet was served by Arriva bus services 484 and 485 but it has since been replaced by the ArrivaClick demand responsive transport in 26/11/2020.

Civic identity
The football team Gravesend and Northfleet FC changed their name to Ebbsfleet United F.C. in the summer of 2007. However, in June 2012, the project was stalled by a lack of funding.<ref>The Guardian, "Images of the shortlisted designs "</ref> Swan Valley Community School closed in 2013, and was replaced by The Ebbsfleet Academy, a new school operating from the same building and serving the same communities, but under entirely new management and largely new staff.

References

External links
 Ebbsfleet Development Corporation
 Visit Swanscombe & Greenhithe Town Guide
 "Ebbsfleet Valley", ICON Magazine''
 Ebbsfleet Valley—BBC
 Ebbsfleet Valley—ebbsfleetvalley.com
 Patrick Barkham, "Britain's housing crisis: are garden cities the answer?", 2 October 2014
 "Vision of Ebbsfleet garden city for 65,000 struggles to take root: Critics including architect Richard Rogers have labelled the project unsustainable, fractured and incoherent", 4 January 2016

Archaeological sites in Kent
New towns in England
New towns started in the 2010s
Redeveloped ports and waterfronts in England
Thames Gateway
Nationally Significant Infrastructure Projects (United Kingdom)
Unparished areas in Kent
Borough of Dartford